Norfolk Island elects on territorial level a legislature. The Norfolk Legislative Assembly has 9 members, elected for a three-year term. The last assembly was the 14th, elected on 13 March 2013. On 17 June 2015, the Australian government abolished the assembly, ending self-government on the island. Norfolk Island Regional Council, a local government body with significantly-restricted powers, was established in July 2016 to perform local-level governance on the island.

At the election on 17 March 2010 the following residents were elected to the 13th Assembly:
Tim Sheridan (934 votes)
Craig Anderson (813 votes)
Andre Nobbs (717 votes)
David Buffett (576 votes)
Melissa Ward (554 votes)
Michael King (545 votes)
Lisle Snell (472 votes)
Rhonda Griffiths (459 votes)
Robin Adams (452 votes)

The current Chief Minister is Lisle Snell. The current Administrator is Neil Pope.

The only political party on Norfolk Island is the Norfolk Island Labor Party, a wing of the Australian Labor Party, which is led by Assembly member Mike King. However, the Canberra Liberals, the ACT division of the Liberal Party of Australia, operates an interest council on the island.

References

Norfolk Island